Brad Gooch (born 1952) is an American writer.

Biography
Born and raised in Kingston, Pennsylvania, he graduated from Columbia University with a bachelor's degree in 1973 and a doctorate in 1986.

Gooch has lived in New York City since 1971. His 2015 memoir Smash Cut recounts life in 1970s and 1980s New York City, including the time Gooch spent as a fashion model, life with his then-boyfriend filmmaker Howard Brookner, living in the famous Chelsea Hotel during the first decade of the AIDS crisis.

Gooch is married to writer and religious activist Paul Raushenbush; they have two children.

Bibliography

Books
The Daily News (1977) poetry
Jailbait and Other Stories (1984) stories
Hall And Oates (1985) biography
Billy Idol (1986) biography
Scary Kisses (1990) novel
City Poet: The Life and Times of Frank O'Hara (1993) biography
The Golden Age of Promiscuity (1996) novel
Finding the Boyfriend Within (1999) self-help 
Zombie 00 (2000) novel
Godtalk (2002) spiritual self-help
Dating the Greek Gods: Empowering Spiritual Messages on Sex and Love, Creativity and Wisdom (2003) spiritual self-help
Flannery : A Life of Flannery O'Connor (2009) biography
Smash Cut: A Memoir of Howard & Art & the '70s & the '80s (2015) memoir
Rumi's Secret: The Life of the Sufi Poet of Love (2017) biography

Essays, reporting and other contributions
(essay in) Boys Like Us: Gay Writers Tell Their Coming Out Stories, Patrick Merla (ed.) Avon Books. 1996

Critical studies and reviews
 Review of Flannery.

Critical reception
His book Jailbait and Other Stories was selected by Donald Barthelme for a Pushcart Foundation Writer's Choice Award.  His writing has appeared in the Paris Review, Partisan Review, Bomb, the New Republic, Harper's Bazaar, The New Yorker, Vanity Fair, Out, New York, the Los Angeles Times Book Review, The Nation, Travel + Leisure, and American Poetry Review.

His most acclaimed work is a biography of the poet Frank O'Hara, City Poet. His book, Finding the Boyfriend Within, calls for gay men to cultivate self-respect by cultivating an imaginary lover.

References

External links
Interview on Planetout.com
Boyfriend Review

American male non-fiction writers
LGBT people from Pennsylvania
Gay memoirists
Living people
1952 births
American gay writers
American biographers
American memoirists
Columbia College (New York) alumni
21st-century LGBT people